Astrid Kumbernuss (born 5 February 1970 in Grevesmühlen, Mecklenburg-Vorpommern) is a former German female shot putter and discus thrower.

Her career started at the SC Neubrandenburg sports club. Her greatest successes were gold medals at the 1995, 1997 and 1999 World Championships in Athletics, and the 1996 Summer Olympics in Atlanta. In 1997, she was awarded Athlete of the Year. 
In 1998, she gave birth to her son Philip, and retired from her sports career in 2005.

International competitions

References

 
 

1970 births
Living people
People from Grevesmühlen
German female shot putters
German female discus throwers
East German female discus throwers
East German female shot putters
Olympic athletes of Germany
Olympic gold medalists for Germany
Olympic bronze medalists for Germany
Athletes (track and field) at the 1996 Summer Olympics
Athletes (track and field) at the 2000 Summer Olympics
Athletes (track and field) at the 2004 Summer Olympics
World Athletics Championships athletes for Germany
World Athletics Championships medalists
European Athletics Championships medalists
Medalists at the 2000 Summer Olympics
Medalists at the 1996 Summer Olympics
Olympic gold medalists in athletics (track and field)
Olympic bronze medalists in athletics (track and field)
European Athlete of the Year winners
World Athletics Championships winners
Sportspeople from Mecklenburg-Western Pomerania